Donald H. Enlow (January 22, 1927 – July 5, 2014) was an American scientist known for his contributions to field of orthodontics through his work and understanding of the process of growth and development, especially of the human facial structure.

Life
He was born in Mosquero, New Mexico in 1927 to Martie and Donald C. Enlow. He married Martha McKnight in 1945. Enlow enlisted in Coast Guard during WWII. After returning from the war, he earned his bachelor's degree in 1949 and his master's degree from the University of Houston in 1951. He then earned his PhD in Vertebrate Morphology from Texas A&M University in 1955. He eventually became an Assistant Professor at West Texas State University. After that he worked as an anatomy professor in the University of Michigan School of Dentistry for 15 years. He eventually moved from Michigan to become the Chairman of Anatomy at West Virginia University School of Medicine. He was named the Thomas J. Hill Distinguished Professor of Physical Biology after he joined the Case Western Reserve University Orthodontic Department as its Chair in 1977.

Research
During his PhD years, Enlow started fossil field prospecting in the area of West Texas. On one of his expeditions, he came across an idea of making a "ground" thin section of a bone fragment that he picked up from the ground. At Texas A&M, Dr. Stanley John Olsen who was a vertebrate Paleontologist helped Enlow with his specimens. After finishing his dissertation, Enlow co-authored 3 papers titled "A Comparative Histological Study of Fossil and Recent Bone Tissues" in Texas Journal of Science with Dr. Brown. These papers were important because they helped established a field of research in which bone growth and the life history of an organism were articulated from a Paleohistology point of view. Enlow's focused his research during his career in how bone remodeling regulates growth of facial structure. He authored the book The Human Face in 1968 which focused on his research.

While at Michigan, Enlow shifted his research from bone histology to Craniofacial Growth and Development. He published numerous papers and a book titled Handbook of Facial Growth in 1975. After moving to Case Western, he wrote the book Essentials of Facial Growth with Dr. Mark Hans. A recent version of the book was published in 2008. Following are some of the principles that were developed based on Enlow's research.
 Enlow's Counterpart Principle - The growth of any cranial or facial structure relates to other 'counterparts' in face and cranial area. ex. Maxilla and Mandible, Middle Cranial Fossa and Mandibular Ramus
 Enlow's V Principle - The movement happens at the wide end of the V during growth as a result of deposition of bone inside and resorption outside.

Career
Over his lifetime, Enlow amassed over 100,000 slides of bone specimen that were useful in bone morphology and histology. Before his death, he gave the collection as a gift to Hard Tissue Research Unit at New York University College of Dentistry. The bone specimens in these slides come from every vertebrate group in this world such as fish, mammals etc.

In his honor, New York University held "Donald H. Enlow International Research Symposium: An Integrative Approach to Skeletal Biology in 2006 to commemorate 50th anniversary of Enlow's first published paper in Texas Journal of Science. He retired in 1992 after 15 years of service at Case Western University.

Enlow was diagnosed with Myasthenia gravis and he later died at the age of 84 in Wisconsin.

Positions held
 Case Western Reserve University School of Dental Medicine, Dean, 1984-1986
 Case Western Department of Orthodontics, Professor and Chair, 1977-1989
 Physical Growth Program at University of Michigan's Center for Human Growth and Development, Director, 1957-1972
 West Virginia School of Medicine, Professor & Chairman of Anatomy, 1972-1977

Awards
 Fellow in the Royal Society of Medicine
 Award of Special Merit by AAO

References

1927 births
2014 deaths
People from San Miguel County, New Mexico
Texas A&M University alumni
University of Houston alumni
University of Michigan faculty
People from Harding County, New Mexico